Melanochromis heterochromis is a species of cichlid endemic to Lake Malawi.  This species can grow to a length of  SL.

References

heterochromis
Fish of Lake Malawi
Fish of Malawi
Fish described in 1993
Taxa named by Nancy Jean Bowers
Taxa named by Jay Richard Stauffer Jr.
Taxonomy articles created by Polbot